The following is a list of players and who appeared in at least one game for the Detroit Wolverines franchise of the National League from  through .

β= indicates Baseball Hall of Famer


A

B
Lady Baldwin
Ed Beatin
Dave Beadle
Charlie Bennett
George Bradley
Frank Brill
Fatty Briody
Cal Broughton
Dan Brouthers β
Lew Brown
George Bryant
Henry Buker
Bill Burke
Dick Burns

C
Count Campau
Bob Casey
Dan Casey
Chub Collins
Pete Conway
Frank Cox
Sam Crane

D
Harry Decker
George Derby
Jim Donnelly
Jerry Dorgan
Mike Dorgan
Fred Dunlap

E

F
Joe Farrell
Will Foley
Tom Forster

G
Charlie Ganzel
Ed Gastfield
Bill Geiss
Joe Gerhardt
Charlie Getzien
Tom Gillen
Barney Gilligan
Henry Gruber
Ben Guiney

H
Jim Halpin
Ned Hanlon β
Sadie Houck

I

J
Frank Jones
Henry Jones
Jack Jones

K
Tom Kearns
Nate Kellogg
Walt Kinzie
Lon Knight

L
Sam LaRocque
Jack Leary
Dick Lowe
Henry Luff

M
Jim Manning
Tom Mansell
Jack McGeachey
Mike McGeary
Deacon McGuire
Frank McIntyre
Mox McQuery
Frank Meinke
Jerrie Moore
Gene Moriarty
Tom Morrissey
Charlie Morton
Frank Mountain
Mike Moynahan
Tony Mullane

N
Parson Nicholson

O
Dan O'Leary
Frank Olin

P
Marr Phillips
Martin Powell
Walter Prince

Q
Joe Quest

R
George Radbourn
Charlie Reilley
Hardy Richardson
Frank Ringo
Yank Robinson
Jack Rowe

S
Edward Santry
Ted Scheffler
Frank Scheibeck
Milt Scott
Dupee Shaw
Billy Shindle
Billy Smith
Phenomenal Smith
Dan Stearns
Sy Sutcliffe

T
Billy Taylor
Sam Thompson β
Sam Trott
Dasher Troy
Larry Twitchell

U

V

W
Walt Walker
Joe Weber
Jake Wells
Deacon White
Will White
Art Whitney
Stump Wiedman
Julius Willigrod
Sam Wise
Fred Wood
George Wood

X

Y

Z
Chief Zimmer

External links
Baseball Reference

Major League Baseball all-time rosters
Wolverines all-time roster